Belvidere North High School is the second high school in Belvidere, Illinois and part of the Belvidere Community Unit School District 100.  It is right next to Seth Whitman Elementary School and Belvidere Central Middle School.

Athletics
Belvidere North's team 
name is Blue Thunder.  They are part of the NIC-10 conference.  The school's sports teams include volleyball, football, baseball, basketball, tennis, swimming, track and field, soccer, golf, cross country.

References

Educational institutions established in 2007
Schools in Boone County, Illinois
Public high schools in Illinois
Belvidere, Illinois
2007 establishments in Illinois